The United States Amateur Championship, commonly known as the U.S. Amateur, is the leading annual golf tournament in the United States for amateur golfers. It is organized by the United States Golf Association and is currently held each August over a 7-day period.

In 1894 there were two tournaments called the "National Amateur Championship". One of them was played at Newport Country Club and was won by William G. Lawrence, and the other took place at Saint Andrew's Golf Club and was won by Laurence B. Stottard. This state of affairs prompted Charles B. Macdonald of the Chicago Golf Club to call for the creation of a national governing body to authorize an official national championship, and the Amateur Golf Association of the United States, which was soon to be renamed the United States Golf Association, was formed on December 22 of that year. In 1895 it organized both the first U.S. Amateur Championship and the first U.S. Open, both of which were played at Newport Country Club.

There are no age or gender restrictions on entry, but players must have a handicap index of 2.4 or less. Originally, entry was restricted to members of USGA-affiliated private clubs (and, presumably, international players who were members of private clubs affiliated with their nations' golf governing bodies), a restriction that was not lifted until 1979. The tournament consists of two days of stroke play, with the leading 64 competitors then playing a knockout competition held at match play to decide the champion. All knockout matches are over 18 holes except for the final, which consists of 36 holes, separated into morning and afternoon 18-hole rounds. Nowadays it is usually won by players in their late teens or early twenties who are working towards a career as a tournament professional. Before World War II more top-level golfers chose to remain amateur, and the average age of U.S. Amateur champions was higher.

Many of the leading figures in the history of golf have been U.S. Amateur Champion, including Bobby Jones five times, Jerome Travers four times, Jack Nicklaus twice and Tiger Woods three times (all consecutive; the only player to win three in a row). Woods' first win, as an 18-year-old in 1994, made him the youngest winner of the event, breaking the previous record of 19 years 5 months set by Robert Gardner in 1909. In 2008, New Zealander Danny Lee became the youngest ever winner, only to be eclipsed by 17-year-old An Byeong-hun the following year.  Before the professional game became dominant, the event was regarded as one of the majors. This is no longer the case, but the champion still receives an automatic invitation to play in all of the majors except the PGA Championship. In addition, the runner-up also receives an invitation to play in the Masters and the U.S. Open. The golfers must maintain their amateur status at the time the events are held (unless they qualify for the tournaments by other means).  The USGA added an exception starting with the 2019 U.S. Amateur Championship in that the tournament winner only may turn professional and keep his berth for the ensuing U.S. Open.

With the growth in professional golf through the latter half of the 20th century, the U.S. Amateur has become dominated by younger players destined to soon become professionals. In 1981 the USGA established a new championship called the U.S. Mid-Amateur for amateurs aged at least 25 years old in order to give players who had not joined the professional ranks, and those who had regained their amateur status, a chance to play against each other for a national title.

Field

While most players at the U.S. Amateur advance through sectional qualifying, many players are exempt each year. Below are the exemptions:

Winners of the U.S. Amateur each of the last ten years.
Runner-up of the U.S. Amateur each of the last three years.
Semi-finalists of the U.S. Amateur each of the last two years.
Quarter-finalists of the U.S. Amateur the previous year.
Any player who qualified for the current year's U.S. Open.
Those returning 72 hole scores from the previous year's U.S. Open.
The amateur with the lowest score from the current year's U.S. Senior Open.
From the U.S. Mid-Amateur: winner each of the last two years and runner-up from the previous year.
From the U.S. Amateur Public Links: winner each of the last two years and runner-up from the previous year. Because the Amateur Public Links was discontinued after its 2014 edition, the runner-up exemption disappeared after the 2015 U.S. Amateur, and the winner's exemption disappeared after 2016.
From the U.S. Junior Amateur: winner each of the last two years and runner-up from the previous year.
From the U.S. Senior Amateur: winner each of the last two years and runner-up from the previous year.
Playing members of the two most recent Walker Cup teams.
Playing members of the two most recent U.S. Eisenhower Trophy teams.
Playing members of the current year's U.S. Men's Copa de las Américas team.
Winner of the current year's individual NCAA Division I Championship.
Winner of the British Amateur Championship each of the last five years.
Top fifty golfers in World Amateur Golf Ranking.
Winner of the current year Latin America Amateur Championship.

In all cases, the exemptions only apply if the player has not turned professional as of the tournament date.

Winners

Multiple winners
Eighteen players have won more than one U.S. Amateur, through 2021:
 5 wins: Bobby Jones
 4 wins: Jerome Travers
 3 wins: Walter Travis, Tiger Woods
 2 wins: H. J. Whigham, Chandler Egan, Robert Gardner, Chick Evans, Francis Ouimet, Lawson Little, Bud Ward, Willie Turnesa, Harvie Ward, Charles Coe, Jack Nicklaus, Deane Beman, Gary Cowan, Jay Sigel

Twelve players have won both the U.S. Amateur and U.S. Open Championships, through 2022:
 Jerome Travers: 1907, 1908, 1912, 1913 Amateurs; 1915 Open
 Francis Ouimet: 1914, 1931 Amateurs; 1913 Open
 Chick Evans:^ 1916, 1920 Amateurs; 1916 Open
 Bobby Jones:^ 1924, 1925, 1927, 1928, 1930 Amateurs; 1923, 1926, 1929, 1930 Opens
 Lawson Little: 1934, 1935 Amateurs; 1940 Open
 Johnny Goodman: 1937 Amateur; 1933 Open
 Gene Littler: 1953 Amateur; 1961 Open
 Arnold Palmer: 1954 Amateur; 1960 Open
 Jack Nicklaus: 1959, 1961 Amateurs; 1962, 1967, 1972, 1980 Opens
 Jerry Pate: 1974 Amateur; 1976 Open
 Tiger Woods: 1994, 1995, 1996 Amateurs; 2000, 2002, 2008 Opens
Bryson DeChambeau: 2015 Amateur; 2020 Open
Matt Fitzpatrick: 2013 Amateur; 2022 Open

Thirteen players have won both the U.S. Amateur and British Amateurs, through 2021:
 Walter Travis: 1900, 1901, 1903 U.S.; 1904 British
 Harold Hilton:^ 1911 U.S.; 1900, 1901, 1911, 1913 British
 Jess Sweetser: 1922 U.S.; 1926 British
 Bobby Jones:^ 1924, 1925, 1927, 1928, 1930 U.S.; 1930 British
 Lawson Little:^ 1934, 1935 U.S.; 1934, 1935 British
 Willie Turnesa: 1938, 1948 U.S.; 1947 British
 Dick Chapman: 1940 U.S.; 1951 British
 Harvie Ward: 1955, 1956 U.S.; 1952 British
 Deane Beman: 1960, 1963 U.S.; 1959 British
 Bob Dickson:^ 1967 U.S.; 1967 British
 Steve Melnyk: 1969 U.S.; 1971 British
 Vinny Giles: 1972 U.S.; 1975 British
 Jay Sigel: 1982, 1983 U.S.; 1979 British

Two players have won both the U.S. Amateur and U.S. Amateur Public Links in the same year, through 2021:
 Ryan Moore: 2004
 Colt Knost: 2007

^ Won both in same year. Bobby Jones won the Grand Slam in 1930, winning the U.S. Amateur, U.S. Open, British Amateur, and British Open.

Most times hosted
Six 
Merion Golf Club (1916, 1924, 1930, 1966, 1989, 2005)
 The Country Club (1910, 1922, 1934, 1957, 1982, 2013)
Oakmont Country Club (1919, 1925, 1938, 1969, 2003, 2021)
Five 
Pebble Beach Golf Links (1929, 1947, 1961, 1999, 2018)
Four
Chicago Golf Club (1897, 1905, 1909, 1912)
Garden City Golf Club (1900, 1908, 1913, 1936)
Baltusrol Golf Club (1904, 1926, 1946, 2000)

Future sites

Source

Exemptions 
The U.S. Amateur results lead to exemptions into other tournaments. Except for the U.S. Open exemption for the winner, the exemption holds only if the golfer retains their amateur status. All the exemptions listed below pertain to only the winner of the U.S. Amateur, unless otherwise stated.

Here are the major exemptions:

 The next 10 years of the U.S. Amateur
 The next 3 years of the U.S. Amateur (runner-up)
 The next 2 years of the U.S. Amateur (semi-finalists)
 The following year's U.S. Amateur (quarter-finalists)
 The following year's U.S. Open (winner and runner-up) (winner is permitted to turn professional before the tournament)
 The following year's Masters Tournament (winner and runner-up)
 The following year's Open Championship
 The next 10 years of the Amateur Championship

Here are the other exemptions:

 The following year's Monroe Invitational (top 8 + top 20 stroke portion)
 The following year's Northeast Amateur (top 8)

References

External links
Official site - most of the information is in the archive sections

Amateur golf tournaments in the United States
Amateur Championship